Ng Wing Biu (born 13 October 1944) is a Hong Kong former épée and foil fencer. He competed in three events at the 1976 Summer Olympics in Montreal, Canada.

References

External links
 

1944 births
Living people
Hong Kong male épée fencers
Olympic fencers of Hong Kong
Fencers at the 1976 Summer Olympics
Fencers at the 1978 Asian Games
Asian Games competitors for Hong Kong
Hong Kong male foil fencers
20th-century Hong Kong people